Braintree is a constituency in Essex represented in the House of Commons of the UK Parliament since 2015 by James Cleverly, a member of the Conservative Party. He is a former Chairman of the Conservative Party and currently the Secretary of State for Foreign, Commonwealth and Development Affairs. He was also formerly a minister in the Foreign, Commonwealth and Development Office. The constituency was created for the February 1974 general election.

History 
The seat was created for the February 1974 general election, largely from the majority of the constituency of Maldon, including the towns of Braintree and Witham. It underwent a major redistribution for the 2010 general election when Witham was formed as a separate constituency. This resulted in making the seat safer for the Conservatives.

The former Leader of the House Tony Newton held the seat for the Conservatives from its creation in 1974 until 1997 when Alan Hurst defeated Newton to gain the seat for Labour. Brooks Newmark defeated Hurst in 2005 to regain the seat for the Conservatives, and held it until he stood down and was succeeded by James Cleverly, also a Conservative.

Constituency profile
The constituency includes the town of Braintree at its southern end, and a large area of rural Essex to the north.

Boundaries and boundary changes

1974—1983: The Urban Districts of Braintree and Bocking, and Witham, the Rural District of Braintree, and the civil parishes of Boreham, Broomfield, Chignall, Good Easter, Great and Little Leighs, Great Waltham, Little Waltham, Mashbury, Pleshey, Roxwell, Springfield, and Writtle in the Rural District of Chelmsford.

Formed largely from the existing constituency of Maldon. The northern part of the Rural District of Chelmsford was transferred from the Constituency of Chelmsford and a small part of the Rural District of Braintree was previously in Saffron Walden.

1983—1997: The District of Braintree wards of Black Notley, Bocking North, Bocking South, Braintree Central, Braintree East, Braintree West, Coggeshall, Cressing, Hatfield Peverel, Kelvedon, Panfield, Rayne, Terling, Three Fields, Witham Central, Witham Chipping Hill, Witham North, Witham Silver End and Rivenhall, Witham South, and Witham West, and the Borough of Chelmsford wards of Broomfield and Chignall, Good Easter Mashbury and Roxwell, Great and Little Leighs and Little Waltham, Great Waltham and Pleshey, and Writtle.

The Boreham and Springfield ward of Chelmsford Borough was transferred to the constituency of Chelmsford.

1997—2010: The District of Braintree wards of Black Notley, Bocking North, Bocking South, Braintree Central, Braintree East, Braintree West, Coggeshall, Cressing, Earls Colne, Gosfield, Hatfield Peveril, Kelvedon, Panfield, Rayne, Terling, Three Fields, Witham Central, Witham Chipping Hill, Witham North, Witham Silver End and Rivenhall, Witham South, and Witham West.

The parts in the Borough of Chelmsford now included in the new County Constituency of West Chelmsford. Two small wards (Earls Colne and Gosfield) transferred from Saffron Walden.

2010—present: The District of Braintree wards of Bocking Blackwater, Bocking North, Bocking South, Braintree Central, Braintree East, Braintree South, Bumpstead, Cressing and Stisted, Gosfield and Greenstead Green, Great Notley and Braintree West, Halstead St Andrews, Halstead Trinity, Hedingham and Maplestead, Panfield, Rayne, Stour Valley North, Stour Valley South, The Three Colnes, Three Fields, Upper Colne, and Yeldham.

The 2010 redistribution saw a major change, with southern and western areas, including the town of Witham, forming the basis of the new County Constituency of Witham.  Extended northwards, gaining the District of Braintree wards previously in Saffron Walden, including the town of Halstead.

Members of Parliament

Elections

Elections in the 2010s

Elections in the 2000s

Elections in the 1990s

Elections in the 1980s

Elections in the 1970s

See also
List of parliamentary constituencies in Essex

Notes

References

External links
nomis Constituency Profile for Braintree — presenting data from the ONS annual population survey and other official statistics.

Constituencies of the Parliament of the United Kingdom established in 1974
Parliamentary constituencies in Essex
Braintree District